The HP Slate 7 is a 7-inch Android 4.1 tablet that was announced on February 24, 2013 and started shipping in April 2013.  It has a stainless-steel frame, black front, and gray or red soft-touch back.  A key feature of this small tablet is the microSDHC slot. It is HP's second Android device (the Photosmart eStation C510 printer contained an Android tablet that lacked Google Services).

In December 2013, HP released the HP Slate7 Plus, HP Slate7 Extreme, HP Slate8 Pro and HP Slate10 HD and those four ran Android 4.2.2.

Software
The Slate 7 runs mainly stock Android 4.1, with the exception of HP ePrint, an application that will allow a user to print wirelessly from most Android applications.

When asked if webOS, HP's mobile operating system would be installable, Omar Javaid, VP of Product Management stated that it is possible, however any such port would have to be undertaken by the webOS community.

Reception
Unlike most electronic devices the pixels used in the Slate 7 screen are not square, but rectangular; therefore the screen image is stretched in the tablet's long axis, making circles into ovals, squares into rectangles, and so on. Reviewers did not like that it was underpowered, had a sub-par display, and had poor battery life compared to the other tablets sold in the middle of 2013. The device was also well known for charging and battery problems.

See also
 HP Slate
 HP Slate 21
 HP Slate 500
 HP Touchpad

References

External links
 Official Site
 Photos, CNET
 Video, Engadget

Slate 7
Tablet computers
Android (operating system) devices
Tablet computers introduced in 2013